Łukasz Kaczmarek (born 29 June 1994) is a Polish professional volleyball player. He is a member of the Poland national team, a participant in the Olympic Games Tokyo 2020, silver medallist at the 2022 World Championship, and a two–time Champions League winner (2021, 2022). At the professional club level, he plays for ZAKSA Kędzierzyn-Koźle.

Career
Kaczmarek began his sporting career as a beach volleyball player. In 2015, he debuted in PlusLiga as Cuprum Lubin player. In 2016, he signed a new two–year contract with Cuprum Lubin, and became one of the best scorers in PlusLiga. In 2018, after the successful season and debut in the national team, he joined ZAKSA Kędzierzyn-Koźle.

Honours

Clubs
 CEV Champions League
  2020/2021 – with ZAKSA Kędzierzyn-Koźle
  2021/2022 – with ZAKSA Kędzierzyn-Koźle

 National championships
 2018/2019  Polish Cup, with ZAKSA Kędzierzyn-Koźle
 2018/2019  Polish Championship, with ZAKSA Kędzierzyn-Koźle
 2019/2020  Polish SuperCup, with ZAKSA Kędzierzyn-Koźle
 2020/2021  Polish SuperCup, with ZAKSA Kędzierzyn-Koźle
 2020/2021  Polish Cup, with ZAKSA Kędzierzyn-Koźle
 2021/2022  Polish Cup, with ZAKSA Kędzierzyn-Koźle
 2021/2022  Polish Championship, with ZAKSA Kędzierzyn-Koźle
 2022/2023  Polish Cup, with ZAKSA Kędzierzyn-Koźle

Youth national team
 Beach volleyball
 2011  FIVB U19 World Championship, with Maciej Kosiak
 2011  CEV U18 European Championship, with Sebastian Kaczmarek
 2012  FIVB U19 World Championship, with Sebastian Kaczmarek
 2013  CEV U20 European Championship, with Sebastian Kaczmarek

Individual awards
 2019: Polish Cup – Best Opposite
 2019: Polish SuperCup – Most Valuable Player

References

External links
 
 Player profile at PlusLiga.pl 
 
 Player profile at Volleybox.net

1994 births
Living people
People from Krotoszyn
Sportspeople from Greater Poland Voivodeship
Polish men's volleyball players
Olympic volleyball players of Poland
Volleyball players at the 2020 Summer Olympics
Cuprum Lubin players
ZAKSA Kędzierzyn-Koźle players
Opposite hitters